Ferment is a Canadian religious current affairs television miniseries which aired on CBC Television in 1965.

Premise
This series provided an overview of recent developments in the Christian church, hosted by the United Church Observer's assistant editor Kenneth Bagnall.

"Peace and Brotherhood", the first episode, concerned such topics as civil rights, nuclear warfare and the church in Quebec. The second episode's theme was a "new Protestant reformation" with guests Paul Tillich and John A. T. Robinson. Personal Christian beliefs was the theme of episode three. The final programme speculated on the church's future, particularly in the suburban area of Canada, the United States and the United Kingdom.

Scheduling
This half-hour series was broadcast on Mondays at 10:00 p.m. (Eastern) from 31 May to 21 June 1965.

References

External links
 

CBC Television original programming
1965 Canadian television series debuts
1965 Canadian television series endings